Women in 1970s Spain in the democratic transition were able to legally organise as feminist groups. The adultery law was repealed in 1978. No consistent changes to childcare issues emerged.

1970s in transition 
During Spanish elections in the transition period, women favored centrist political parties and disavowed more the extremist elements like ETA, Herri Batasuna (HB), Catalan nationalists ERC, and Galician radicals.

In the transition period, HOAC, JEC, Comisiones Obreras and UGT were largely focused on the creation of a new Spanish democracy. While female only labor associations had existed underground in the Francoist period, these organizations and the specific needs of women they espoused were largely ignored by  HOAC, JEC, Comisiones Obreras and UGT.

Basque nationalism 
ETA militants killed women in this period, notably female members of Guardia Civil.  ETA justified this as these women not being women, only representatives of Guardia Civil. Estimates in this period female membership in ETA at around 10%. Egizan was a feminist organization affiliated to ETA as their women's political organization.  María Dolores Gonzalez Catarain had become a leader in ETA by the end of the 1970s.  Prior to this, most women were only collaborators in the movement.  Descriptions of ETA women being "dangerous elements" of Spanish society would continue into the democratic transition period.

Women's rights

Abortion 
Because abortion was illegal in Spain, during the 1970s, Spanish women who could afford it went to London to get abortions. Between 1974 and 1988,  195,993 Spanish women traveled to England and Wales to get an abortion. Women also went to the Netherlands in this period to have abortions.  France was not an option, as at the time it required women who had abortions to be French residents and have resided in the country for at least three months.  Women then needed to wait a week to reflect before they could get an abortion. An unknown number of women went to North Africa and Portugal for abortions. During the mid-1970s, the Catholic Church preached that  no physical barrier should be present during sex, and that even post-coital washes were problematic as they interfered with the primary goal of sex being conception.  The Catholic Church taught the only acceptable reproductive control methods were abstinence and the rhythm method.  The Church tried to interfere in any efforts to change this.
In the 1970s and 1980s, feminists were the only major group demanding the government address women's needs to have access to abortion services.  They played a critical role in changing public perception around abortion.

Adultery 
In the immediate post-Franco era, feminists in Spain were united in their goal to eliminate the law that made adultery a criminal offense.  Their efforts were joined by many anonymous women and some men.  They found support in their goals from progressive political parties.

Childcare 
Childcare was an aspect of women's rights taken up during the democratic transition period.  Starting in 1975, state policy switched to offering more opportunities for children to be enrolled in free state-run educational preschool programs.  These classes were for children aged three to five, the three years before the state mandated age to start attending school of six years old. The childcare programs that the government focused on had two distinct features.  One was that programs for 4 and 5-year-olds be educational.  Many of these programs were run through the Ministry of Education and Culture. There were few comparable programs for children three and under.  Second was that private childcare facilities had to be approved and regulated by the government.  This, unlike other western countries, included attempts to regulate private daycare run by people from their homes. None of these programs were focused on the needs of working parents.  This was because of a widespread belief that mothers made the best caregivers of their children.

Despite increased feminist interests in childcare as an component of women's rights in the democratic period, feminists were not consistent in their demands and were unable to mobilize around the issue. Feminist groups, feminists inside state institutions and women's sections of Spanish unions differed from their European peers in that they infrequently drove needs for a wide range of childcare services to be offered by the state and have not acted as primary supporters of the needs of mothers.  When they were working as actors in this area, it was generally on behalf of children and focused on the education needs of children under the age of six.  Major complaints have involved the lack of government run educational opportunities for children in this age group.

Spanish feminists may have been hesitant to address the issue of motherhood and the needs of mothers for a few reasons.  The first is the period of the dictatorship did not allow for the creation of detailed feminist thinking in a Spanish specific context.  This development of a feminist ideology would only take place during the transition, as feminist developed specific goals that they would like to see enacted in a new democratic Spain.  Second, much of the feminist thinking at the time was inspired by reading the philosophies of feminists from other countries.  International feminists in the mid-1970s were largely unconcerned with the concept of motherhood or the care of minor children.  Consequently, this did not peculate through internationally influenced Spanish feminist thought.  Lastly, Spain was in a dictatorship, where definitions of male and female sexuality were rigidly imposed by the state.  Goals in responding specifically to the end of the dictatorship were often around achieving political equality, and less so about specific economic issues of women.  At the same time, not discussing motherhood was viewed by some as rejecting the dictatorship's definition of womanhood that exclusively defined women in that way.

Some parties on the right like Alianza Popular (now Partido Popular) were open to talking about educational opportunities for young children but were reticent to discuss childcare as a result of their own beliefs in traditional Spanish motherhood, where women were not allowed to participate in the labor market.  Centrist parties were also hesitant to discuss the issue, lest they lose their broad base of support. Union of the Democratic Center (UCD) made no reference to childcare in their 1977 electoral campaign materials. PSOE supported educational programs for children under 6 in their campaign materials, but these were largely part of their program to try to reduce class inequality through education; this was not out of concern for childcare needs of working mothers.

Contraception 
At the time of Franco's death in November 1975, almost all the laws related to female sexuality were still intact, including prohibitions on the use of contraceptives. During the mid-1970s, the Catholic Church preached that  no physical barrier should be present during sex, and that even post-coital washes were problematic as they interfered with the primary goal of sex being conception.  The Catholic Church taught the only acceptable reproductive control methods were abstinence and the rhythm method.

Divorce 
Divorce in the late Franco period and early transition period was available via ecclesiastical tribunals.  These courts could nullify marriage for a fee.  Consequently, they were mostly only available to the rich, with the most famous types of this nullification involving  Isabel Presley and Carmencita Martínez Bordiú. The Civil Courts would only be involved in separation procedures at the provisional level. The Catholic Church was actively opposed to civil divorce in the mid and late 1970s.

By year

1975 

To avoid bloodshed following the death of Franco on 20 November 1975, left leaning parties like PSOE and PCE agreed to the "pact of silence" which largely involved not discussing or seeking to prosecute atrocities committed by the Franco regime during its time in power, or by either side during the Spanish Civil War.Partido Feminista de España was founded in 1975  by Lidia Falcón, constituted in 1979 in Barcelona and registered in 1981.

Palmira Pla Pechovierto returned from Venezuelan exile in the late 1970s.  The teacher immediately became involved with PSOE in Castellón, and went on to represent the area in the 1977  Constitutional Legislature of Spain.

Franco's death in 1975 allowed women to emerge publicly, no longer needing to remain clandestine.  It led to the mass organization of feminist organizations.

A May 1975 law meant public schools could now legally teach the Basque language. This instruction had to be optional and take place at the end of regular school hours.  The principal had full discretion as to whether or not such classes would be offered. This law was not backed by government funding to pay teachers, nor train them. October 1975 saw another important law impacting the Basque language come into effect.  This law acknowledge regional languages as important in Spain and that there was a need to preserve them.  At the same time, it re-stated that despite this, these regional languages could not be used in official government business, courts or legislative assemblies.

1976 
Feminists largely rejected the 15 December 1976 Political Reform Referendum.  In general, they did not believe the Francoists were capable of enacting reforms that would benefit women.

Inmaculada Benito and María Ángeles Muñoz were two of the last women in Spain to be tried for adultery, only escaping prison when the adultery law was repealed in 1978. Their cases were brought in mid-1976. At the time, Benito was a 21-year-old medical student from Zaragoza while Muñoz was a 30-year-old domestic worker living in Barcelona.  Both had dependent children and both had separated from their husbands. In December 1976, two women accused of adultery in Lugo and Pontevedra.  The woman from Lugo was acquitted but the woman in Pontevedra was ordered to serve a six-month prison penalty and pay a fine of 100 pesetas.  Their cases started after the cases of Benito and Muñoz.

As a European Christian Democratic party, UCD opposed the legalization of divorce and abortion, believing in what they saw as "the preservation of the family." At the same time, PSOE and UCD supported its legalization.  Most of the independents in 1976-1977 were right wing, with the primary exception of Suárez who supported the legalization of divorce.

In the a four-month period in 1976, 2,726 Spanish women went to London for abortions.

The first organization created about women's reproductive health and birth control was opened in Madrid in 1976 by  Federico Rubio. Asociación de Mujeres de Aluche was one of the earlier  women's reproductive health and birth control centers, creating in the first years after the end of the dictatorship.

In 1976, Aureliano Lobo died and María Bruguera Pérez threw herself into organizing the Health Committee of CNT.

Women in PSOE and UGT in 1976

After Franco's death, María Begoña Abdelkader García was part of a group that created PSC-PSOE AS in Hospitalet (Barcelona). When the UGT was still semi-clandestine in 1976, Ludivina García Arias was elected at XXX UGT Congress in Madrid in April as UGT Secretary of Emigration of the Executive Commission. Carmen García Bloise attended the same congress, representing the Section of Grenoble (Isère). In 1976, Carmen Muriana joined UGT. At the  December 1976  XXVII PSOE Congress in Madrid, Carmen García Bloise  was elected secretary of Administration of the Executive Commission. Ana María Ruiz-Tagle became involved in feminist groups and trying to address women's rights starting in 1976 during the transition.  She would go on to be a Spanish Senator representing PSOE in 1982, 1986 and 1989.

Women in PNV in 1976

PNV met clandestinely in a Franciscan convent in the final days of the regime.  Following Franco's death, they would not have their own headquarters were in 1976 after a builder donated a house for the party to use in Bilbao. Garbiñe Urresti returned from exile in Venezuela and ran a clandestine Basque language radio station. She helped prepare programs and helped prepare information for air. She also was an on air personality.

1977 

While the pill was still illegal in 1977, 8 million were sold in Spain. Adolfo Suarez said of legalization of contraception in 1977  "We must provide legal coverage and transparency to what is normal and usual at the street level." In 1977, Juan Luis Cebrián was charged with disclosing information about contraceptive use in an article he wrote in the newspaper Sunday Times as part of a series by British doctors.  He was facing the possibility of 200,000 pesetas (GBP£1,670) fine and six months in prison.  In the article, he mentioned that contraceptive use was widespread in Spain, with one million women using some form on a regular basis.  Some forms were sold publicly, in pharmacies with government approval. The Suarez government sent the Cortes Generales a bill to decriminalize contraceptives on 15 December 1977.

Sección Feminana was formally dissolved in 1977, two years after the death of Franco.

Following the death of Franco in 1975 and the amnesty of 1977, many of ETA's female activists returned to the Basque region.  A hardcore group though would remain outside in places like France and Latin America for many years.  These activists outside the country espouse the radical philosophy that until they were their own nation, the Basque people were a people without a home.

Women in  UGT in 1977

Carmen Romero became UGT's Executive Education Committee Press Secretary. Because of an amnesty, Carmen Muriana got her job at Standard back. Carmen Romero became UGT's Executive Education Committee Press Secretary. Josefina Arrillaga would briefly rejoin PSOE during the transition period.

Spanish general elections of 1977 
Ahead of the 15 June 1977 general elections, political and social conditions largely remained unchanged.  Leftist parties did not necessarily accept demands of most feminists accept for certain issues like the legalization of conception.  Many feminists involved in political groups abandoned specific goals in favor of broader political goals, resulting in a diluted form of feminism being adapted by major leftist parties.

PCE was legalized on 9 April 1977.  Its legalization was viewed at the time as an important required step in Spain's democratic transition.  The decision by Adolfo Suarez to legalize the party was sped up as a result of PCE's actions following the 24 January 1977 murders of seven labor lawyers in Atocha. Ahead of the 1977 elections, PCE announced it was "the party of the liberation of women".

Ahead of the first democratic elections in 1977 following the death of Franco in 1955, Spaniards overwhelming were supportive of the legalizing of divorce.
Ahead of the 1977 elections, UCD did not put forth a coherent party policy on major social issues of the day in order to try to broaden their appeal among Spanish voters, who had largely been apolitical as a result of regime constraints on political activity.  Their primary goal in the 1977 elections was to create a rupture with the past and the dictatorship via reform. The Cortes of 1977 had to try to find a way to navigate the demands of the newly liberated left, who wanted to see reforms like the legalization of abortion and divorce, with the Catholic Church who opposed both.  The last time the state had been in conflict with the Church was in 1931, with the founding of the Second Republic and no one wanted to see renewed political violence.

The transition period saw Unión de Centro Democrático (UCD) come into power led in 1977 by  Prime Minister Adolfo Suarez on a liberal platform espousing women's rights.  Because his party lacked an absolute majority to govern, he was forced to form a coalition with other more right leaning parties.  This resulted in a dilution of women's priorities and angered many women's rights advocates and feminists, serving to splinter these groups along ideological priority based grounds that saw one side view participation in the constitutional draft process as being part of emancipated citizenship while another faction saw it as oppressed women being forced to participate in their own repression. Radical feminists opposed to UCD felt vindicated in their doubts following the 1979 general elections, which saw 21 women or 6 percent of the 350 seats belonging to women, down from 22 in the previous congress.  At the same time, UCD continued to be the largest political organization for women with the most representation of any party in Congress, with 11 women deputies and 4 women senators.  In contrast, PSOE refused to address women's issues more broadly and to prioritize women's concerns.  They did not move women's positions up their list, and consequently the number of female PSOE representatives fell in 1979 to 6 from the previous high of 11. One of the reasons UCD went into decline after the 1977 elections was the party was forced to take positions on major issues of the day, including divorce, abortion and the use of public money for private schools.

1978 

Feminists associations were legally allowed starting in 1978, a year after PCE began a legal political party.

Compulsory following of Catholic canonical law as a legal definition in Francoist Spain and the democratic transition did not end in Spain until the 1978 Spanish constitution.

The Primeras Jornadas de la Mujer were held in the Basque Country from 8–11 December 1978. The Primeras Jornadas de la Mujer were held in Granada in 1979.  At both, the issue of dual militancy was discussed by women trade unionists and political party members in attendance.  For many of these women, even though they were able to work, their husbands often demanded they do traditional women's housework and childcare because the husband said his unionist and political activities were more important than hers.  This left many women feeling insecure in their activism.

Carmen Conde became the first won to become a member of the Real Academia Española, ascending to her position in February 1978.
 

In UGT elections in 1978,  Carmen Muriana was elected to the Comité de Empresa, and would go on to hold many more leadership positions in UGT.

On 26 May 1978, adultery was eliminated as a criminal offense in Spain's penal code. This took place as a result of the repeal of Articles 449 and 452 of the Penal Code. The Justice Committee of the Congress of Deputies did this by unanimous consent. Definitions of abandonment were also changed, as they were not consistent for both sexes with women previously only being able to claim abandonment if her husband forced his wife to support his mistress while they were living in the same house. On 7 October 1978, the law was changed to decriminalize the sale of contraceptives, along with information on how to use them. The Senate bill that passed to decriminalize adultery was different than the one passed by Congress.  Consequently, for the first time the Joint Congress-Senate Committee had to meet to reconcile these differences. The primary issue was whether adultery could be used as a reason to disinherit someone, with Congress saying it could not be used while the Senate version said it could be used.  In the end, the version put forth by Congress became the final version. National Federation of Progressive Women President Yolanda Besteiro de la Fuente said of the rescinding of this law,  "It meant overcoming a historical discrimination of women, who could be punished with six years in prison if they committed adultery, faced with the impunity of this same behavior if committed by a man. It consecrated the freedom of women in their sexual relations and produced an authentic social transformation changing the traditional concept of marriage and, therefore, of the family."

1978 contraception decriminalization 
1978 was the year that contraception became a driving issue among Spanish feminists.  Their goal going into the year was to see contraception decriminalized by year end.

By April 1978, the issue of decriminalizing contraception was being debated in the Spanish Cortes, a new national legislative body with only 21 women. Communist María Dolores Calvet pointed out during the debate that contraception legalization was one of the issues agreed upon as part of the Moncloa Pacts.  This discussion took place around the same time that the decriminalization of abortion also took place, with division along ideological lines. UCD could agree with PSOE to pass legislation to avoid procreation but not over the issue of terminating a pregnancy.  UCD got support from the right to ban the sale of contraceptives that were "harmful to the health".  PSOE rallied the left, managing to prevent by a single vote, the ability for the government to make decrees that would limit contraceptive advertising.  This was largely a result of abstentions from UCD. Socialist Vicente Sotillo pointed out in the debate that UCD's efforts to decriminalize contraceptives while at the same time criminalizing the sale of contraceptives harmful to health was incoherent.  Catalan Communist José Solé Barberá compared the government's lack of willingness to fully decriminalize contraceptives as akin to the policies of Hitler, Stalin and Franco.  Communists and socialists were successful in seeing their measures come into law.  By a vote of 140 to 141, contraceptive issuance was legalized but had limits on the ability to advertise them.

The  Cortes Generales formally decriminalized the sale, use and disclosure of information about contraceptives on 7 October 1978. It became the first time in the history of Spain that a woman's sexuality was separated from procreation.  The law gave women control over the number of children they wanted to have, when they wanted to have children, and if they wanted to have children while single or married.  This would later prove pivotal in a Spanish context as it came to other rights for women that had previously centered around procreation and sexuality.

Despite the legalization of contraception in 1978, voluntary sterilization remained a crime in Spain, with doctors punishable by prison time for performing such procedures. At the same time that contraception was decriminalized, the government announced it would create 74 centers for the orientation of families to attend to married couples. Spanish gynecologists were upset about the word orientation, seeing it as paternalistic and inappropriate.  Many also refused to ask women using these clinics for their family books that showed proof of marriage.

In 1978, sales of the pill would exceed 10 million units.

Spanish Constitution of 1978 

Following Franco's death, Spain underwent massive change that culminated in the Constitution of 1978.  This document returned Spain to being a country where women were guaranteed full equal rights under the law.  Reforms in the post-Francoist period saw the Catholic Church lose official status in government, the age of legal majority moved from 21 to 18, and marriage defining men and women equally. Under Article 14 of the 1978 Spanish Constitution, all people were considered equal before the law.  It prohibited the state from discriminating based on birth, sex, religion or political opinion. Article 9.2 states, "It is the responsibility of public powers to promote conditions ensuring that the freedom and equality of individuals and of the groups to which they belong are real and effective."

In the Constituent Assembly that drafted the 1978 Spanish constitution, only 27 members were women.  The final drawing up of the Spanish constitution had no women involved in the process.  The only woman involved in the 39 member commission that debated the constitutional process was UGT's María Teresa Revilla. Revilla said of the process, "The Constitution was a fundamental and decisive leap for women in Spain. From there, the inequalities in the laws began to be corrected. The woman really began to be able to be what she herself achieved with her effort (...) I believe that none of the deputies of that constituent legislature were satisfied with the regulation of the Crown in regard to the order of succession. How was it then possible to discriminate against women in flagrant contradiction with what was said in article 14 of the Constitution itself? Even today I can not find sufficient reason ."

The Cortes of 1977 had to try to find a way to navigate the demands of the newly liberated left, who wanted to see reforms like the legalization of abortion and divorce, with the Catholic Church who opposed both.  The last time the state had been in conflict with the Church was in 1931, with the founding of the Second Republic and no one wanted to see renewed political violence.

On 22 May 1978, four UCD deputies and four Socialist deputies met at a restaurant in Madrid to try to find a compromise on major issues as they related to how they were addressed in the constitution.  These issues included divorce and abortion.  The UCD deputies went into the meeting having consulted their PCE and Catalan counterparts and gotten their approval for these talks.  All agreed this was a necessary step to avoid a breakdown in the process of writing a new constitution. Allianz Popular was left out of these discussions. One of the reasons UCD went into decline after the 1977 elections was the party was forced to take positions on major issues of the day, including divorce, abortion and the use of public money for private schools.

In the first draft of the constitution, both PSOE and PCE supported the legalization of abortion and divorce.  UCD supported the legalization of divorce, but at a later date.  UCD opposed the legalization of abortion.  Coalición Popular opposed both the legalization of abortion and divorce.  A compromise was reached on divorce that would see the issue addressed in later legislation through the text of Article 32.2 which said, "the law will regulate the forms of matrimony... [and] the causes of separation and dissolution."  No agreement could be reached over abortion, and Article 15 had the ambiguous text "todos tienan derecho a la vida" at the insistence of UCD and Coalición Popular so the door could be left open to make abortion illegal.

Feminists groups watched the process of creating a new Spanish constitution with concern.  On 6 December 1978, a number of groups presented Cortes president Antonio Hernández Gil with a list of their concerns about it. Signatories included women who were members of  UCD, PSOE, PC, MDM, ADM-PT and ORT-ULM. They wanted the constitution to commit the government to incorporating women into the workforce, that marriage should be based on equality of spouses, that marriages could be dissolved by mutual consent of either spouse, that every women should have the right to decide how many children she would have, and that women should have access to birth control. These women were opposed to Article 15, which said that "everyone has the right to life" as they felt it could be interpreted as offering protection to fetuses.  Their fears would be realized on 11 April 1985, when this constitutional wording was used to declare an abortion law illegal.

The Basque Nationalist Party objected to the new Spanish constitution of 1978 on the grounds it was a Spanish constitution.

1979 

In 1979, 16,433 Spanish women had abortions in London.  1979 was a pivotal year for abortion rights with the Bilbao Trial.  The trial involved ten women and one man who were prosecuted for performing abortions.  Prosecutors announced their intention to seek prison time of more than 100 years.  With the original trial announced on 26 October 1979, it was not held until 1982 as a result of being suspended several times in the interim.  The trial absolved nine of the women involved.  A man who induced the abortions and a woman who performed them were found guilty.  The ruling was appealed, with the appeal being suspended several times before being heard at the end of 1983.  The results of the appeal resulted in four women being acquitted, and six women and the man were given prison sentences.  In the end, those seven would eventually be pardoned by the state.

The November 1979 XXXII Conferencia Episcopal said the Church did not want to interfere in the ability of legislators to do their job.  Nonetheless, they advised that legislators considering legalization of divorce be allowed only in specific circumstances.  This included that divorce was not a right, mutual consent not be allowed, and that divorce should only occur when there was no other remedy for the marriage.  The Ministry of Justice asked the Catholic Church to stop meddling, and the Catholic Church had to accept that they would not have any involvement in civil marriages and civil divorces. Monsignor Jubany from Barcelona's final request in meeting with members of the Cortes was to make divorce expensive as a way of preventing it.

1979 Spanish local elections 

In the municipal elections of 1979, the first since Franco's death, the Basque Nationalist Party won 11 of the 21 seats in the Basque Country.

Spanish general elections of 1979 

The PCE adopted in their status at the 1978 Party Congress a statement that said they were "the vanguard political organization of the working class."  At the same time, they also asserted they were "the progressive forces of Spain.  In it are voluntarily integrated men and women proceeding from the working class, the peasantry, the forces of culture, and from other sectors of the population." Women were just one of many social groups the organization was trying to attract.

Ahead of the 1979 elections, PSOE's González decided to abandon Marxism as a party principle.  He believed that doing so would make the party more attractive to Spanish women voters who were supporting more centrist oriented parties.  As a result, PSOE managed to win over many women from Union of the Democratic Centre.  In some regions, women PSOE voters heavily outnumber their male counterparts.

References 

Social history of Spain